Indian Mountaineering Foundation is an apex national body which organize and support, mountaineering and rock climbing expeditions at high altitudes in the Himalayas. The organization also promotes and encourages schemes for related adventure activities and environment-protection work in the Indian Himalayas. IMF has organized many expeditions to the high peaks in the Himalayas including Mount Everest.

History of IMF
The first ascent of Mount Everest in 1953 by Sir Edmund Hillary and Tenzing Norgay generated interest in mountaineering in India which led to the establishment of Indian mountaineering Foundation. IMF was formed in 1957 as the Sponsoring Committee of the Cho Oyu Expedition. The foundation was registered on 3 November 1961 and the new building was inaugurated by Indira Gandhi in 1980, then Prime Minister of India.

Alternative names
In 1959, the organization changed its name to the Sponsoring Committee of Everest Expedition and in the following year it was changed to Sponsoring Committee for Mountaineering Expeditions. On 15 January 1961 it was established as the Indian Mountaineering Foundation with its headquarters in Mumbai, India.

IMF Mountain Film Festival
The IMF Mountain Film Festival is a mountain film festival organized by Indian Mountaineering Foundation, India. This competitive event showcases adventure films shot in the Himalayas. The film festival takes place at the campus of Indian Mountaineering Foundation in New Delhi, India.

The festival is directed by Maninder Kohli, son of the legendary Himalayan mountaineer, Capt. Mohan Singh Kohli who was a member of India's first expedition to the summit of Everest in 1965. Capt. Mohan Kohli was the President of the Indian Mountaineering Foundation from 1989 to 1993.

References

External links

 

Mountaineering in India
1957 establishments in Delhi
Sports organizations established in 1957
Organisations based in Delhi
Sports governing bodies in India